"The See-Through Man" is the fourth episode of the fifth series of the 1960s cult British spy-fi television series The Avengers, starring Patrick Macnee and Diana Rigg, and guest starring Moira Lister, Warren Mitchell, Roy Kinnear, and John Nettleton. It was first broadcast in the Southern region of the ITV network on Monday 30 January 1967. ABC Weekend Television, who commissioned the show for ITV, broadcast it in its own regions five days later on Saturday 4 February. The episode was directed by Robert Asher, and written by Philip Levene.

Plot
A Russian agent invisible to the naked eye plans to concoct an invisible formula and steals files from the government bureau meant to be projects for Professor Quilby.

Cast
Patrick Macnee as John Steed
Diana Rigg as Emma Peel
Moira Lister as Elena
Warren Mitchell as Brodny
Roy Kinnear as Quilby
Jonathan Elsom as Ackroyd
John Nettleton as Sir Andrew Ford
Harvey Hall as Ulric
David Glover as Wilton

References

External links

Episode overview on The Avengers Forever! website

The Avengers (season 5) episodes